Road rash may refer to:

 Road rash, a colloquial term for skin injury caused by abrasion with road surfaces

Video games 
 Road Rash, a motorcycle-racing video game series:
 Road Rash (1991 video game), a racing and vehicular combat video game
 Road Rash II, a racing and vehicular combat game
 Road Rash (1994 video game), a racing and vehicular combat game
 Road Rash 3, a racing and vehicular combat game
 Road Rash 3D, a racing and vehicular combat game
 Road Rash 64, a racing and vehicular combat game
 Road Rash: Jailbreak, a racing and vehicular combat game